The 1960-61 season marked the immediate return of Cherno More to the top flight of Bulgarian football after the club finished bottom of A Group in 1958-1959.

Overview
Despite spending the majority of the season mid-table, Cherno More narrowly avoided relegation on the last day of the season. The team was seven points clear of Spartak Sofia with only five matches left in the two-points-for-a-win league. Spartak's resurgence began with an away victory against their namesakes and Cherno More's city rivals. On the penultimate day of the season Cherno More lost against city rivals Spartak Varna at home, while Spartak Sofia thrashed Dunav Ruse 5-0 to move just a point behind the Sailors with both teams scheduled to play in Sofia in the last round. Spartak Sofia recorded another convincing win by defeating runners-up Levski Sofia 4-1 but eventually went down despite having a +4 goal difference, after Cherno More, without a win away the whole season, prevailed against Septemvri Sofia 2-1.

Republican Football Group A

Matches

League standings

Results summary

Soviet Army Cup

References

External links
 http://www.retro-football.bg/?q=bg/196061
 http://a-pfg.com/%D1%81%D0%B5%D0%B7%D0%BE%D0%BD/1960-1961/

PFC Cherno More Varna seasons
Cherno More Varna